Gua is a census town in Pashchimi Singhbhum district in the Indian state of Jharkhand. It is a mining township situated in the Chotanagpur Plateau. The mines are operated by the Steel Authority of India Limited and are linked to IISCO at Burnpur.

Beside having a small geographical area Gua is having a dominant position in Jharkhand politics. Many private companies such as Jindal Steel, Adhunik, Rungta, Ashirwad enterprises etc. are making huge profit out of these area but are not seeking and interested for the education, health and other necessities for the common public.
A school, DAV Senior Secondary Public School, is run by the DAV community for the good  development of students.

Demographics
 India census, Gua had a population of 10,891. Males constitute 52% of the population and females 48%. Gua has an average literacy rate of 63%, higher than the national average of 59.5%: male literacy is 74%, and female literacy is 50%. In Gua, 14% of the population is under 6 years of age.

The local inhabitants are known as Ho people, but the second largest group of inhabitants of this area is Oriya.

Geography
The source of water at Gua is the South Karo River.

Culture
The main festivals of Gua are Durga Puja, Diwali, Kali Puja, Makar Sankranti, Vishwakarma Puja, Ganesh Chaturti, Ram Navami, Krishna Jayanti, Basanti Puja, Chatt, Mage Purv, Eid and Mines Safety Week as well.

Transport
Gua, a beautiful place amidst Saranda Forest is well connected by rail and road to major township of Chaibasa, Chakradharpur, Tatanagar(Jamshedpur), Rourkela, Cuttack and Bhubaneshwar. A direct train comes from Tata to Gua every day- Tata Gua passenger. There are a few bus services to Tata every day as well. There is a train from Jamda( 10 km from Gua) to Calcutta- Jan Shatabdi express which connects Gua to the nearest metro.

References

Mining communities in India
Cities and towns in West Singhbhum district